Widowmaker Pass is a heavily crevassed and therefore dangerous pass leading from Larsen Glacier to Reeves Glacier, between Mount Janetschek and Mount Gerlache in Victoria Land. Given this expressive name by the New Zealand Geological Survey Antarctic Expedition (NZGSAE), 1962–63.

Mountain passes of Victoria Land
Scott Coast